The 2021–22 Loyola Marymount Lions men's basketball team represented Loyola Marymount University during the 2021–22 NCAA Division I men's basketball season. The Lions were led by second-year head coach Stan Johnson and played their home games at Gersten Pavilion in Los Angeles, California as members of the West Coast Conference

Previous season
In a season limited due to the ongoing COVID-19 pandemic, the Lions finished the season 13–9 overall and 7–5 in WCC play to finish in third place. They defeated San Francisco in the second round of the WCC tournament before losing in the quarterfinals to Saint Mary's.

Offseason

Departures

Incoming transfers

2021 recruiting class

Roster

Schedule and results

|-
!colspan=12 style=| Exhibition

|-
!colspan=12 style=| Non-conference regular season

|-
!colspan=12 style=|WCC regular season

|-
!colspan=12 style=|WCC tournament

Source

References

Loyola Marymount Lions men's basketball seasons
Loyola Marymount
Loyola Marymount basketball, men
Loyola Marymount basketball, men
Loyola Marymount basketball, men
Loyola Marymount basketball, men